La Couvertoirade is a commune in the Aveyron department in southern France.

Geography
La Couvertoirade is located on the Larzac plateau.

History and sites of interest
This well-preserved fortified town was owned by the Knights Templar, under orders from the Commandery of Sainte-Eulalie, from the twelfth century. The Templars built the fortress there during the 12th and 13th centuries; its two upper floors have since been removed. Following their dissolution in 1312, the Templars' property in the causses was taken by the Knights of St John of Jerusalem who were responsible for building the curtain wall at La Couvertoirade between 1439 and 1450.

Like other Larzac villages, the population fell rapidly in the 19th century, to as few as 362 by 1880.  Today, it is largely inhabited by craftsmen working with enamel, pottery, weaving and similar crafts. It is one of the Les Plus Beaux Villages de France (most beautiful villages of France).

Population

See also
Communes of the Aveyron department

References

External links

 Tourist office website
 Pictures of the Knights Templar Castle: , 

Communes of Aveyron
Plus Beaux Villages de France
Aveyron communes articles needing translation from French Wikipedia